Lham hlou (Arabic: لحم لحلو). also known as lham lahlou and tajine lahlou. which means "sweet meat" or "sweet tajne", is an Algerian sweet dish made with meat and mainly prunes, possibly with apricots and decorated with raisins and almonds in a syrup of sugar and orange blossom water. The meat and vegetables are first sauteed with onions and smen (traditional preserved North African butter). This dish is served as a starter or as a dessert during Ramadan and on the occasion of wedding celebrations.

Some recipes, such as La cuisine Algerienne's (1970), call for sprinkling the prunes with toasted almonds. and to steam the prunes prior to dipping them in the sweet sauce. Steamed prunes can be accompanied by almonds (1 almond for each prune).

References

Algerian cuisine
Algerian culture
African cuisine
Berber cuisine
Arab cuisine
Ottoman cuisine